The Minister of Finance of Turkey is the head of the Ministry of Treasury and Finance and a member of the Cabinet of Turkey.

Ministers of Finance of the Grand National Assembly (1920–1923)

Ministers of Finance of the Republic of Turkey (1923–present)

See also 
 Cabinet of Turkey

Sources
Finance Ministers of Turkey

Finance Ministers